Updegraff is an unincorporated community in Clayton County, Iowa, United States. The county seat of Elkader lies approximately 15 miles to the northwest.

History
Updegraff's population was 27 in 1902.

References

Unincorporated communities in Clayton County, Iowa
Unincorporated communities in Iowa